James Arthur Smith (born July 20, 1955) is a former American football player.  He played college football for the University of Michigan from 1974 to 1976. He also played wide receiver for six seasons for the Pittsburgh Steelers from 1977 to 1982 before starring on the Birmingham Stallions of the rival United States Football League (USFL).  After the USFL's demise, Smith played a final season for the Los Angeles Raiders in 1985.

Early years
Smith grew up in Robbins, Illinois, and attended Dwight D. Eisenhower High School in Blue Island, Illinois, where he earned All-Conference and All-State honors. In his senior year, he led the Eisenhower Cardinals to the South Suburban Conference title.

University of Michigan
Smith was a flanker and wingback for the University of Michigan from 1974 to 1976.  In three years at Michigan, he caught 73 passes for 1,687 yards (23.1 yards per reception) and 14 touchdowns. He also returned 51 punts for 525 yards, an average of 10.3 yards per return. He also ran with the ball 56 times for 394 yards, an average of 7.0 yards per carry.  On November 8, 1975, in a victory over Purdue, Smith had a career-high 184 receiving yards on five catches, including an 83-yard touchdown that set a record as the longest pass completion in Michigan history. He was selected as a consensus first-team wide receiver on the 1976 College Football All-America Team.

Professional football
Smith was selected by the Pittsburgh Steelers in the third round (75th overall pick) of the 1977 NFL Draft. He played for the Steelers from 1977 to 1982, backing up Hall of Famers Lynn Swann and John Stallworth and earning two Super Bowl rings in the process.  Smith's best season with the Steelers was 1980 when he caught 37 passes for 711 yards and nine touchdowns.  He had another strong year in 1981 with 29 passes for 571 yards and seven touchdowns.  In 1982, Smith led the NFL with an average of 22.8 yards per reception.  In six years with the Steelers, Smith caught 113 passes for 2,103 yards and 25 touchdowns.

In April 1983, Smith signed a three-year contract to play for the Birmingham Stallions in the newly formed USFL. In order to persuade him to jump to the USFL, Smith was offered a sum greater than any NFL receiver was then making.  He led the Stallions in receiving each year from 1983 to 1985. In 1983, he caught 51 passes for 756 yards and three touchdowns. In 1984, he caught 89 passes and led the USFL with 1,481 receiving yards and eight touchdowns. In the USFL's final season, 1985, Smith had his best year as a professional, finishing third in the USFL with 87 catches for 1,322 yards.  He also led the USFL's receivers with 20 touchdown receptions. He made both the 1985 USFL all-league team and The Sporting News's 1985 USFL All-Star Team.

See also
Lists of Michigan Wolverines football receiving leaders

References

External links
 

1955 births
Living people
American football wide receivers
Birmingham Stallions players
Los Angeles Raiders players
Michigan Wolverines football players
Pittsburgh Steelers players
People from Blue Island, Illinois
People from Harvey, Illinois
People from Robbins, Illinois
Players of American football from Illinois
African-American players of American football
21st-century African-American people
20th-century African-American sportspeople